Maja Harapit (or Maja e Arapit) is a mountain in the Accursed Mountains range in the north of Albania. The mountain is on the edge of the National Parks Theth.

The mountain is located near the mountain pass of Qafa e Pejës north of Theth between the mountains of the Bjeshkët e Nemuna in the West - completed by the Maja Radohimës - and the Maja Jezercë massif in the east. While the steep south wall of the Shala Valley which is part of the mountain is actually based on a broad saddle between the two great massifs, the height of  steeply to a rocky point jutting which it juts from. The tip and the surrounding saddle is made of rugged rock, of sinkholes and caves penetrating karst formations.

Albania's longest horizontal cave is located beneath the south wall. Within the cave, 15 species have been discovered.

References

External links 
 One day hike around Harapit
 Geoquest Albanien-Kletterexpedition 2010
 International Caving Expedition Maja Arapit 2009

Mountains of Albania
Accursed Mountains